Gastromancy is from Ancient Greek gastḗr (meaning "belly" or "stomach") and manteíā (meaning "divination" or "prophecy"). It may refer to:

 Gastromancy, a method of divination by using stomach sounds to represent the voices of the dead 
 Crystal gazing, a method for seeing visions achieved through trance induction by means of gazing at a crystal